Pedicypraedia is a genus of sea snails, marine gastropod mollusks in the family Ovulidae, one of the families of cowry allies.

Species
Species within the genus Pedicypraedia include:
Pedicypraedia atlantica Lorenz, 2009

References

Pediculariinae
Monotypic gastropod genera